Mona Nicoară is a Romanian director and producer. She is best known for her work on the documentary films Our School and The Distance Between Me and Me.

Life and career
Mona was born in Ineu, Romania and is currently based in New York. She was graduated from the Bucharest University and Columbia University in New York. In 2001, she started her career as an associate producer for Children Underground. Her directorial debut documentary film Our School premiered in the United States at the 2011 Tribeca Film Festival and won the Grand Jury Prize for the Best US Feature at SilverDocs. Her second documentary film The Distance Between Me and Me is about Romanian poet Nina Cassian. She has taught writing and literature at Columbia University and the Cooper Union and film at NYU Tisch and Rutgers University.

Filmography

References

External links

 

Living people
People from Ineu
University of Bucharest alumni
Romanian film directors
Year of birth missing (living people)